The War of Art (a word play on The Art of War) may refer to:

 The War of Art (book), 2002 book by Steven Pressfield
 The War of Art (American Head Charge album), 2001 album by metal band American Head Charge
 The War of Art (Badawi album), 2022 album by electronic artist Badawi
 "The War of Art" (The Simpsons), 2014 episode of The Simpsons

See also

 War art, art featuring warfare
 
 
 
 The Art of War (disambiguation)
 War (disambiguation)
 Art (disambiguation)